The 1986 United States Senate election in North Dakota was held on November 4, 1986. Incumbent Republican U.S. Senator Mark Andrews ran for re-election to a second term, but was defeated by Democratic-NPL nominee Kent Conrad.

Major candidates

Democratic-NPL 
 Kent Conrad, State Tax Commissioner (1981–1986)

Republican 
 Mark Andrews, incumbent U.S. Senator

Campaign
Andrews lost re-election by just over 2,000 votes after a rigorous campaign involving personal attacks and other strategies

Results

See also
1986 United States Senate elections

Notes

 1986 North Dakota U.S. Senate Election results

1986
North Dakota
1986 North Dakota elections